Velits is a surname. Notable people with the surname include:

Martin Velits (born 1985), Slovak cyclist
Peter Velits (born 1985), Slovak cyclist

See also
Velis